Discord is a 1933 British drama film directed by Henry Edwards and starring Owen Nares, Benita Hume and Harold Huth. Its plot involves a struggling composer who has to be supported financially by his wealthier wife. It was based on the play A Roof and Four Walls by E. Temple Thurston. It was made at British and Dominion Elstree Studios for release by Paramount Pictures.

Cast
 Owen Nares as Peter Stenning 
 Benita Hume as Phil Stenning 
 Harold Huth as Lord Quilhampton 
 Clifford Heatherley as Mr Moody
 Aubrey Fitzgerald as Mr Bollorn 
 O. B. Clarence as Mr Hemming 
 Harold Scott as Harold
 Archibald Batty 
 Esme Hubbard
 Phyllis Calvert

References

Bibliography
 Low, Rachael. Filmmaking in 1930s Britain. George Allen & Unwin, 1985.
 Wood, Linda. British Films, 1927-1939. British Film Institute, 1986.

External links

1933 films
1933 drama films
Films directed by Henry Edwards
British drama films
Films about composers
British black-and-white films
British and Dominions Studios films
Films shot at Imperial Studios, Elstree
1930s English-language films
1930s British films
British films based on plays
Paramount Pictures films